Hélène de Saint-Père (7 June 1963 – 4 May 2022) was a French actress.

Partial filmography
Hôtel de France
Peau d'Ange
Vendredi soir

References

External links
 

1963 births
2022 deaths
People from Brazzaville
French film actresses
French stage actresses
Cours Florent alumni
20th-century French actresses
21st-century French actresses